Usnocetraria is a genus of foliose lichens in the family Parmeliaceae.

Taxonomy
The genus was circumscribed in 2007 by M.J.Lai and J.C.Wei as a segregate genus of Allocetraria, with Usnocetraria oakesiana selected as the type species. Although eleven species were proposed for transfer into the new genus, only two of them were validly published combinations (Usnocetraria oakesiana and U. kurokawae) because the others lacked basionym citations. A 2009 phylogenetic study suggested that the other proposed Usnocetraria species were not closely related to the type species, and recommended that the genus should be monotypic for U. oakesiana.

Usnocetraria is a member of the large lichen family Parmeliaceae. In 2017, Divakar and colleagues used a then-recently developed "temporal phylogenetic" approach to identify temporal bands for specific taxonomic ranks in the family Parmeliaceae, suggesting that groups of species that diverged within the time window of 29.45–32.55 million years ago represent genera. They proposed to synonymize Usnocetraria with Cetraria, because the former group of species originated relatively recently and fell under the timeframe threshold for genus level. This synonymy was not accepted in a later analysis.

Species
As of April 2021, Species Fungorum accepts two species of Usnocetraria:
Usnocetraria kurokawae 
Usnocetraria oakesiana 

The following recombinations, all proposed by Lai and Wei, have been rejected as not validly published: 
Usnocetraria denticulata 
Usnocetraria globulans 
Usnocetraria potaninii 
Usnocetraria weii 
Usnocetraria xizangensis

Distribution
The type species, Usnocetraria oakesiana, has a wide distribution, having been recorded from Europe, Asia, and North America. Usnocetraria kurokawae is a rare lichen species that is endemic to Japan. It was lectotypified in 2013.

References

Parmeliaceae
Lichen genera
Taxa described in 2007
Lecanorales genera